Ian Thomas Roberts  (born 1952, Blyth, South Australia) is a nationally recognised Australian bird and native vegetation painter; he is a co-director, with his wife Narelle, of the Medika Gallery (Blyth).

From farming to painting
Starting from 1983, Roberts devotes most of his time to painting which was his hobby during the previous 18 farming years. His interest in the natural world explains the main focus of his paintings. He is also a book illustrator; his drawings appeared in Eucalypts of Western Australia's Wheatbelt by French Malcolm and Native Eucalypts of South Australia by Dean Nicolle.

Community involvement
He was a member of a District Council of Blyth, the Blyth Hospital Board and Country Fire Service, & in 2013 is still a member of the Blyth Development Board, BlythCinema, Blyth Progress Association, & Blyth Town Management.

He was also the instigator of Blyth Cinema, a community based movie theater opened in May 2005 in a former Masonic Hall, and continues to be its manager.

The Blyth local and regional (community and private) solar photovoltaic power development was another of Roberts' projects, through his chairmanship of Blyth Development Board. This involved the installation of 2.7 kW of solar power on each of 7 community sporting club-rooms and over 60 private installations from 1KW to 3KW systems and took place in 2009.

Roberts was the prime mover behind the Brooks Lookout development, which was opened on 21 October 2001. This Lookout has sweeping views to 100 km across the Blyth plains and includes a reserve that protects valuable remnant native vegetation.

Roberts was also involved in the establishment of the Padnaindi Reserve in Blyth.  The original development took place in 1984; Roberts designed the 16 panels for the laser cut fence surrounding the park which were installed in 2012.

Honors and recognitions
In 2013, Ian Roberts received a Medal of the Order of Australia (OAM). Previously, he was acknowledged in 2007 as a member of the group of Blyth's Cinema volunteers with the inaugural regional Emu Award and in 2008 travelled to Melbourne to accept the national Westpac Community Idol 2008 Award for  the Blyth Cinema.

The author of Native Eucalypts of South Australia Dr. Dean Nicolle, director and head of research at Currency Creek Arboretum (CCA), which is a world-known eucalypti research facility,  acknowledged Robert's help in producing the book, which included 97 watercolor paintings by Ian Roberts. Nicolle wrote that Ian Roberts "not only painted and allowed reproduction of all the seedlings illustrated in this book, but also grew most of these seedlings at a community nursery at Blyth".

References

External links
Medika Gallery
Ian Roberts profile at Burra Gallery
Ian Roberts LinkedIn profile

Australian painters
1952 births
Living people
Recipients of the Medal of the Order of Australia